Unión Demócrata Cristiana can refer to:

 Christian Democratic Union (Ecuador)
 Christian Democratic Union (Dominican Republic)
 Nicaraguan Christian Democratic Union